Dr. Oszkár Gerde (8 July 1883 – 8 October 1944) was a Hungarian sabre fencer who won team gold medals at the 1908 and 1912 Olympics. After finishing his active career he judged international fencing competitions and worked as a lawyer. Being a Jew, he was deported from Hungary in 1944, and killed in the same year at the Mauthausen-Gusen Concentration Camp in Austria. In 1989 he was inducted into the International Jewish Sports Hall of Fame.

See also
 List of select Jewish fencers

References

1883 births
1944 deaths
Olympic fencers of Hungary
Fencers from Budapest
Hungarian people who died in Mauthausen concentration camp
Fencers at the 1908 Summer Olympics
Fencers at the 1912 Summer Olympics
Jewish Hungarian sportspeople
Olympic gold medalists for Hungary
Olympic medalists in fencing
Medalists at the 1908 Summer Olympics
Medalists at the 1912 Summer Olympics
Hungarian male sabre fencers
Jewish male sabre fencers
International Jewish Sports Hall of Fame inductees
Hungarian Jews who died in the Holocaust